Anna Skawinska is a road cyclist from Poland. She represented her nation at the 1998, 2000, 2002, 2003 and 2005 UCI Road World Championships.

References

External links
 profile at Procyclingstats.com

Polish female cyclists
Living people
Place of birth missing (living people)
1981 births
21st-century Polish women